Ryan Gutierrez (born January 23, 1982 in Fresno, California) is an American football player.

College career

Gutierrez played college football at the University of California at the safety position.

External links
California Golden Bears bio (archived)

http://www.flashfootball.org/

1982 births
Living people
Sportspeople from Fresno, California
American football safeties
California Golden Bears football players